Abul Fateh Daud was a ruler from the Lodi dynasty of Multan who ruled the Emirate of Multan. He was deposed by Mahmud of Ghazni, who also massacred the Ismailis in the course of his conquest of Multan.

Fateh Daud fled to a fort where he immured himself and was finally pardoned by Mahmud of Ghazni on the promise of payment of ransom. Abul Fatah Daud offered a yearly tribute of 200,000 golden dirhams and conversion from Shia Ismaili fiqh to Sunni Hanafi fiqh. The terms were accepted, and Sultan Mahmud Ghaznavi also exacted two million dirhams from the population of Multan by force.

See also
Khafif

References

Pakistani Ismailis
People from Multan
History of Multan
Shia Islam in Pakistan
Punjabi people